Gonzalo Sebastián García (born 6 February 1987 in Buenos Aires) is an Argentine footballer, who plays as a left-back.

Career

García made his professional debut for Racing Club in 2005. In 2007 García was part of the Argentina U-20 team that played in the 2007 South American Youth Championship. Argentina finished 2nd, which qualified them for the 2007 FIFA U-20 World Cup. Argentina eventually went on to win the FIFA U-20 World Cup, but García was not included in the winning squad.

References

External links
Football-Lineups player profile

1987 births
Living people
Footballers from Buenos Aires
Argentine footballers
Argentine expatriate footballers
Association football fullbacks
Argentine Primera División players
Primera Nacional players
Primera B Metropolitana players
Segunda División B players
Racing Club de Avellaneda footballers
Club Atlético Huracán footballers
Olimpo footballers
Club Atlético Platense footballers
Club Almirante Brown footballers
Nueva Chicago footballers
Defensores de Belgrano footballers
Racing de Ferrol footballers
All Boys footballers
Club Atlético San Miguel footballers
Argentine expatriate sportspeople in Spain
Argentine expatriate sportspeople in Italy
Expatriate footballers in Spain
Expatriate footballers in Italy